Merrow is a creature in Irish mythology.

Merrow may also refer to

Merrow, Surrey
Merrow Sewing Machine Company, an American Manufacturer

People
Jane Merrow, British actress
Jeff Merrow (born 1953), American football player
John Merrow (born 1941), American broadcast journalist
John William Merrow (1874–1927), American theater architect
Joseph M. Merrow (1848–1947), American industrialist